Bute Park and Arboretum is a park in Cardiff, Wales. It comprises  of landscaped gardens and parkland that once formed the grounds of Cardiff Castle. The park is named after the 3rd Marquess of Bute, whose family owned the castle.

History and description
The Castle Green was landscaped in the late eighteenth century by Capability Brown, but the park itself was laid out from 1873 on by Andrew Pettigrew, Head Gardener to the 3rd Marquess. The 5th Marquess of Bute presented the park to the Council in 1947 and the park is still owned and managed by Cardiff Council.

Along the east bank of the River Taff and adjoining Cardiff Castle, the park offers a combination of arboretum, flower gardens and recreation grounds. Most of the park is laid to grassland but there is an abundance of woodland and tree-lined avenues. Sophia Gardens and Pontcanna Fields are on the opposite side of the river, reached by two footbridges. Sophia Gardens is home to the Glamorgan County Cricket Ground, where test matches are played, and to the Sport Wales National Centre.

Within the park there are sculptures such as wood carvings formed from retained tree stumps (in 2012 a series of additional carvings were commissioned as part of the Restoration Project) which encourage natural play. An ironwork sundial, originally placed in the park in 1990 after a Festival of Iron event, was removed in 2006 and replaced by a small round formal garden to honour Stuttgart (Cardiff's German twin-town.) This feature was designed by the Parks Service in Stuttgart and planted by horticultural apprentices from both cities as part of a programme of exchange visits between the two parks departments.

The dock feeder canal runs along the eastern edge of the park. Its origins go back to medieval times when it was a millstream, constructed to feed the Lord's Mill, situated below the western walls of Cardiff Castle. This line is clearly seen on the Bute Estate Maps of 1824. In 1833, the line of the mill stream was incorporated as a water source for the development of the Cardiff Docks by the 2nd Marquess of Bute and was reformed as the dock feeder when the docks were constructed 1836-1841. The dock feeder is still the main water supply to Cardiff Docks.

Since 1981, the park has hosted what is now Sparks in the Park, an annual Guy Fawkes Night firework display, the profits from which are distributed to charity. This event is organised every year by Cardiff's local branch of Round Table. In 2010, Cooper's Field hosted a concert by Florence and the Machine.

Bute Park and the grounds of Cardiff Castle are designated Grade I on the Cadw/ICOMOS Register of Parks and Gardens of Special Historic Interest in Wales.

Bute Park Restoration Project

From 2007 Cardiff Council undertook a £5.6 million restoration project, which was part-funded by a £3.1 million grant from the Heritage Lottery Fund. The project provided new facilities and restored historic features in the park, including:

 Summerhouse Kiosk providing refreshments and toilets, built in 2010 to a design that echos William Burges's summerhouse in the park. 
 Animal Wall, designed by William Burges (1827–1881), a stone wall topped by sculpted animal heads, cleaned and conserved in 2010. 
 Blackfriars Friary: Work undertaken to conserve and interpret the medieval Friary remains, using Victorian brickwork walls to mark the building's plan. 
 West Lodge: The restoration and extension of this historic building and gateway provides a visitor information/orientation point, now used as the Pettigrew Tea Rooms. 
 Mill Leat: Reintroduction of water to the old castle moat that runs alongside the original 12th-century mill stream will restore views and enhance the character of the park to the west of Cardiff Castle. 
 Bute Park Arboretum: Improved signage and interpretation will allow increased awareness and understanding of the park's nationally significant tree collection. 
 Education Centre: This new facility is discreetly located within Bute Park Nursery, and playing on the concept of a "secret garden", will be the hub of the park's public education programme. The Council's horticultural staff train here, and it  provides additional refreshment and toilet facilities. 

The park is maintained by a team of Park Rangers and gardeners based on site, who are supported by volunteers.

Bridges and entrances to Bute Park

See also
List of gardens in Wales

References

External links

Parks in Cardiff
Registered historic parks and gardens in Cardiff